John Duncan Sinclair Gordon (11 September 1931 – 26 May 2001) was an English professional footballer who played for Portsmouth and Birmingham City in the First Division as an inside forward.

He made a total of 489 appearances for home-town club Portsmouth, placing him fourth in their all-time appearances list. During his three seasons at Birmingham City he was the club's top scorer in 1959–60, became their all-time top goalscorer in European competition, and played in the 1960 Inter-Cities Fairs Cup Final against Barcelona. On his return to Portsmouth he helped them win the Third Division championship in 1961–62.

Honours
 Portsmouth
 Club's top League scorer 1957
 Third Division champions 1962
 Birmingham City
 Inter-Cities Fairs Cup runners-up 1960
 Club's top scorer 1960
 Club's all-time European top scorer

References

1931 births
2001 deaths
Footballers from Portsmouth
English footballers
Association football inside forwards
Portsmouth F.C. players
Birmingham City F.C. players
English Football League players
Chelmsford City F.C. players